= Gudari Ghat =

- village
- Location within Madhya Pradesh Location within India
- Coordinates: 23.134835°N 77.455072°E
- Country: India
- State: Madhya Pradesh
- District: Bhopal
- Tehsil: Huzur

Population (2011)
  - Total: 860
- Time zone: UTC+5:30 (IST)
- ISO 3166 code: MP-IN
- Census code: 482548

Gudari Ghat is a village in the Bhopal district of Madhya Pradesh, India. It is located in the Huzur tehsil and the Phanda block.

== Demographics ==
According to the 2011 census of India, Gudari Ghat has 181 households. The effective literacy rate (i.e. the literacy rate of population excluding children aged 6 and below) is 74.11%.

Demographics (2011 Census)
	Total	Male	Female
Population	860	447	413
Children aged below 6 years	126	65	61
Scheduled caste	183	98	85
Scheduled tribe	71	39	32
Literates	544	324	220
Workers (all)	242	206	36
Main workers (total)	223	191	32
Main workers: Cultivators	89	85	4
Main workers: Agricultural labourers	87	65	22
Main workers: Household industry workers	4	4	0
Main workers: Other	43	37	6
Marginal workers (total)	19	15	4
Marginal workers: Cultivators	1	1	0
Marginal workers: Agricultural labourers	14	10	4
Marginal workers: Household industry workers	0	0	0
Marginal workers: Others	4	4	0
Non-workers	618	241	377
